The following is a timeline of the history of Panama City, Republic of Panama.

Prior to 20th century

 1519 - Nuestra Senora de la Asuncion de Panama founded by Pedro Arias Dávila.
 1539 - Royal Audiencia of Panama established.
 1671 - Panamá Viejo sacked by privateers Henry Morgan and Robert Searle.
 1673
 New settlement established 5 miles southwest of Panamá Viejo.
 City wall, Palacio de las Garzas, and Saint Dominic Convent built.
 1737 - Fire.
 1752 - Royal Audiencia disestablished.
 1760 - Cathedral built.
 1821 - City becomes part of Gran Colombia.
 1826 - June: City hosts Panama Congress.
 1830 - City becomes part of Republic of New Granada.
 1849 - Panama Star English-language newspaper begins publication.
 1853 - La Estrella de Panamá newspaper in publication.
 1855 - Panama Railway begins operating.
 1856 - April 15: Watermelon Riot.
 1878 - Fire.
 1880 - Bishop's palace built.
 1881 - Panama Canal construction begins.
 1882 - L'Hospital Notre Dame de Canal established.
 1887 - City fire department established.

20th century

 1903 - City becomes part of independent Republic of Panama.
 1904 - Ancon Hospital active.
 1905 - Population: 22,000.
 1908 - National Theatre of Panama opens.
 1911
 Way On Cemetery established.
 Population: 46,500.
 1914 - Panama Canal begins operating.
 1916 - National Exposition of Panama held.
 1924
 National Archive building dedicated.
 Hospital Santo Tomas rebuilt.
 1925 - "Protest strike" against urban conditions.
 1930 - Population: 74,400.
 1935 - University of Panama established.
 1940 - Population: 111,800.
 1947 - December: Anti-U.S. unrest.
 1950 - Population: 127,874.
 1953 - Auto-Cine (drive-in cinema) opens.
 1955 - Club Deportivo Plaza Amador (football club) formed.
 1962 - Bridge of the Americas opens.
 1964 - January: Anti-U.S. unrest.
 1970 - Gimnasio Nuevo Panama (arena) opens.
 1975 - Population: 404,190 (approximate).
 1981 - La Prensa newspaper begins publication.
 1985 - Parque Municipal Summit established.
 1986 - Mossack Fonseca law firm in business.
 1988 - Metropolitan Natural Park opens.
 1989
 December 20: United States invasion of Panama begins.
 Guillermo Endara becomes president
 Mayin Correa becomes mayor of Panamá District.
 1990 - Dictator Manuel Noriega surrenders to United States military forces on January 3.
 1993 - Mi Pueblito created.
 1994 - Ernesto Perez Balladares wins May 1994 elections and becomes president.
 1995
 Club Deportivo Policía Nacional (football club) formed.
 Population: 452,041 (estimate).
 1996
 Marine Exhibition Center of Punta Culebra established.
 Miramar Towers built.
 1997
 Cines Alhambra (cinema) in business.
 Panama Canal Museum established.
 1999
 Mireya Moscoso wins May 1999 elections and becomes the first female president of Panama.
 Juan Carlos Navarro becomes mayor of Panama District.
 Hospital Punta Pacifica founded.

21st century

 2003 - Panama Jazz Festival begins.
 2004 - Martin Torrijos wins May 2004 elections and becomes president.
 2007 - Aqualina Tower built.
 2008
 February: Labour unrest.
 Mormon temple and Ocean One hi-rise built.
 2009
 Estadio Javier Cruz (stadium) opens.
 Cinta Costera land reclamation completed.
 Ricardo Martinelli wins May 2009 elections and becomes president.
 2010
 Ocean Two hi-rise built.
 Population: 880,691.
 2011 - Tower Financial Center, F&F Tower, Yacht Club Tower, Megapolis Tower, The Point, and Trump Ocean Club built.
 2012
 Vitri Tower and Pearl Tower built.
 Mayor Bosco Vallarino resigns; Roxana Méndez becomes mayor.
 International Film Festival of Panama begins.
 2014
 Panama Metro begins operating.
 Juan Carlos Varela wins May 2014 elections and becomes president
 Biomuseo built.
 2016 - Population: 472,856.

References

This article incorporates information from the Spanish Wikipedia.

Bibliography

Published in the 19th century
 
 
 
 
 
 

Published in the 20th century
 
 
 
 
 
 

Published in the 21st century

External links

 Items related to Panama City, various dates (via Europeana)
 Items related to Panama City, various dates (via Digital Public Library of America)

 01
.
.
Panama
Panama history-related lists
Years in Panama
Panama City